Allamuchy may refer to the following in the U.S. state of New Jersey:

Allamuchy Mountain State Park, in Byram Township
Allamuchy Township, New Jersey, in Warren County
Allamuchy (CDP), New Jersey, a census-designated place in the township
Allamuchy Freight House, in the above township, built by the Lehigh and Hudson River Railway
Allamuchy-Panther Valley, New Jersey, a census-designated place and unincorporated area in the above township
Allamuchy Township School District, serves the above township